Margaret Valadian  (born 1936) is an Aboriginal Australian educator and advocate for Indigenous rights, through improved access to education.

Career 
Valadian was born in Darwin, Northern Territory in 1936. Following employment as a welfare worker in the Northern Territory she moved to Brisbane where she was the first Aboriginal graduate of an Australian university when she received her Bachelor of Social Studies from the University of Queensland in 1966. She graduated from the University of Hawaiʻi at the East–West Center with a Master of Education in 1969 and then from the State University of New York with a Master of Social Welfare in 1973. 

While an undergraduate, Valadian spoke of the financial obstacles facing Aboriginal students wishing to attend university at the 1963 conference of the National Union of Australian University Students. 

In 1978 Valadian founded the Aboriginal Training and Cultural Institute in Sydney and  acted as co-director with Natasha McNamara from its inception until 1990. Professor Charles Rowley, who had conducted a national survey of Aborigines in NSW in 1980, said of their work:

Under the auspices of the Australian Institute of Aboriginal Studies, Valadian gave the 1980 Wentworth lecture, "Aboriginal Education: For Aborigines, By Aborigines?"  

Valadian was a member of the Council of the Sydney College of the Arts from 1984 to 1988. She was appointed a member of the NSW Equal Opportunity Tribunal in 1984 and re-appointed for a second three-year term in 1987. 

In 1991 Valadian was invited to give the sixth Frank Archibald Memorial Lecture at the University of New England, the title of her speech being "Aboriginal Education—Development or Destruction. The Issues and Challenges that have to be Recognised".

Honours and recognition 
In the 1976 Queen's Birthday Honours Valadian was appointed Member of the Order of the British Empire for service to Aboriginal welfare. She was promoted to Officer of the Order of Australia in the 1986 Australia Day Honours for "service to the community, particularly in the field of Aboriginal education and culture". She was awarded the Centenary Medal in 2001.

Valadian won a BHP award for the pursuit of excellence in 1984, receiving AU$40,000 for her community service and welfare work.

In 1995 Valadian was awarded an honorary Doctor of Letters by Macquarie University. She was named University of Queensland Alumnus of the Year in 1996.

References

External links 

 Before the Referendum: Margaret Valadian speaks up – 1967 interview by Robert Moore on Four Corners
No Sisterhood: Aboriginal Feminism '75 – excerpt from "A Woman's Place", Four Corners, 8 March 1975
 

1936 births
Living people
Australian women academics
Indigenous Australian women academics
Australian Members of the Order of the British Empire
Officers of the Order of Australia
University of Queensland alumni
University of Hawaiʻi at Mānoa alumni
State University of New York alumni